Nikola Šimić also spelled Nikola Shimich (Serbian: Никола Шимић; Sombor, Habsburg monarchy, 1766 - Sombor, Austrian Empire, 5 January 1848) is credited for being the author of the first modern book on logic in the Serbian language, published in Budapest in two volumes, Volume I in 1808 and Volume II in 1809. His second work,  (The Art of Decent Joking), was published in 1814, also in Budapest.

Nikola Šimić was a polyglot who studied the works of Christian Wolff and Friedrich Christian Baumeister.

Avram Mrazović, a friend of Nikola Šimić,
wrote the second book on logic in Serbian in a similar manner, entitled "Logic, or Reasoning," completed in 1826, the year Mrazović died. The book was not published.

References 

1766 births
1848 deaths